The Visakhapatnam - Araku AC Tourist Passenger is a passenger train belonging to East Coast Railway that runs between Visakhapatnam Junction and Araku. It is currently being operated with 00501/00502 train numbers on a daily basis.

Features 

This train is India's first Vista Dome coach train which goes from scenic view of Eastern Ghats. It has got has an observation lounge, large glass windows with capacity of 40-seat has the double-wide reclining passenger seats that could be rotated 360 degrees.

Service 

The 00501/Visakhapatnam - Araku AC Tourist Passenger runs with an average speed of 33 km/h and completes 129 km in 3h 55m. The 00502/Araku - Visakhapatnam AC Tourist Passenger runs with an average speed of 28 km/h and completes 129 km in 4h 35m.

Route and halts 

The important halts of the train are:

Coach composite 

The train has standard LHB rakes with max speed of 130 kmph. The train consists of 19 coaches:

 2 Vista Dome AC Chair Car

Traction

Both trains are hauled by a Visakhapatnam Loco Shed based WAG-5 electric locomotive from Visakhapatnam to Araku and vice versa.

Rake Sharing 

The train attached with 58501/58502 Visakhapatnam–Kirandul Passenger.

See also 

 Araku railway station
 Visakhapatnam Junction railway station
 Visakhapatnam–Kirandul Passenger

Notes

References

External links 

 00501/Visakhapatnam - Araku AC Tourist Passenger
 00502/Araku - Visakhapatnam AC Tourist Passenger

Transport in Visakhapatnam
Rail transport in Andhra Pradesh
Slow and fast passenger trains in India
Railway services introduced in 2017